La Tante Claire (The Aunt Claire) was a restaurant in Chelsea, London, which opened in 1977 and 1998. Owned and operated by Pierre Koffmann, it gained three Michelin stars in 1983, and held all three until the restaurant moved premises in 1998. It was sold to Gordon Ramsay for his flagship restaurant, Restaurant Gordon Ramsay.

Description
La Tante Claire opened in 1977 at Royal Hospital Road, Chelsea. The signature dish of the restaurant was pig's trotter with chicken mousseline, sweetbreads and morels; which when served elsewhere by Marco Pierre White, are referred to as "Pig's Trotters Pierre Koffmann". Within six years of opening, the restaurant gained its third Michelin star.

The restaurant moved from the original premises in 1998, moving to a location within The Berkeley hotel. Following the closure of the Royal Hospital Road, the premises were sold to Gordon Ramsay and would become his flagship restaurant. In the new location, the restaurant lost its third Michelin star and was reduced to two before closing in 2003.

In 2009, Koffmann opened a pop-up restaurant at Selfridges in London using the menu items from La Tante Claire. In 2010, Koffmann opened his first full-time restaurant since La Tante Claire, Koffmann's, at The Berkeley hotel, the same hotel as La Tante Claire used to be at, although at a different location within the hotel.

Reception
John Wells, writing in 1994 for The Independent, praised the quality of the food at La Tante Claire, Royal Hospital Road, saying "I had a croustade de pommes caramelisees à l'Armagnac. Everything about them spoke of inspired and loving work in the kitchen", although found the prices surprisingly high, "we were given the menu to look at, which even to a spoilt restaurant critic comes as a shock. The cheapest starter is £19."

In 2002, Jan Moir of The Daily Telegraph praised the decor and the staff of La Tante Claire at The Berkeley while comparing the lunch menus of London restaurants with two Michelin stars. Additional praise was given to the wine list, and the side dish that came with the main course.

See also
 List of French restaurants

References

Michelin Guide starred restaurants in the United Kingdom
Defunct restaurants in London
Restaurants established in 1977
2003 disestablishments in the United Kingdom
French restaurants in London
Defunct French restaurants in the United Kingdom